Native vanadium is the mineral form of the metal vanadium, with the accepted name "vanadium". This exceedingly rare mineral was found among fumaroles of the Colima Volcano. Fumaroles of Colima are known of being vanadium-rich, depositing other vanadium minerals, that include shcherbinaite (V2O5) and colimaite (K3VS4).

References

Native element minerals
Vanadium minerals